Kudrat ( Nature) is a 1998 Indian Hindi-language action romance film directed by Raj N. Sippy. It stars Akshaye Khanna and Urmila Matondkar in lead roles.

Plot
Vijay Varma learns a few lessons about love and life. Wooing his sweetheart proves an arduous task as poor Vijay faces constant rejection by the woman who has captured his heart as well as by her family. But when both do a startling volte-face, which is followed by further indecision, Vijay's life seems caught in a perpetual state of bewilderment.

Cast
Akshaye Khanna as Vijay
Urmila Matondkar as Madhu
Paresh Rawal as Sukhiram
Kader Khan as Vijay's grandfather
Aruna Irani as Shanti
Anant Mahadevan as police inspector
Shalini Kapoor

Soundtrack
Soundtrack was composed by Rajesh Roshan. In November 1998, former vice-president of political party Bharatiya Janata Yava Morcha, Rakesh Sethi filed a case against Dev Kohli and singer Poornima for using vulgar language in the song "Ab Tak Hai Puri Azaadi". A local court issued a non-bailable warrant against both on 1 April 2003.
 Aab Tak Hai Puri Azadi... Abhijeet Bhattacharya and Sushma Shreshta
 Aaj Hoke Rahe Apna Milan... Udit Narayan and Preeti Uttam
 Ishq Bhala Kya Hai... Alka Yagnik and Vinod Rathod
 Humse Mohabbat Mein... Kumar Sanu and Sadhana Sargam
 Deewane Do Dil Mile... Alka Yagnik and Udit Narayan
 Tujhe Dene Ko... Kavitha Krishnamurthy and Abhijeet Bhattacharya

References

External links
 

1998 films
1990s Hindi-language films
Indian action films
Indian films about revenge
Films scored by Rajesh Roshan
1998 action films